Garri Kalan is a panchayat village under Keredari CD block in Hazaribagh district in the Indian state of Jharkhand.

Education Facilities: The village Garri Kalan has 2 Primary School, 1 Middle School, 1 Secondary School 
  
Health Facilities:The citizens of this VILLAGE avail Allopathic hospital is situated at a distance of 5–10 km.  Maternity & Child Welfare Center is situated at near High school Garri kalan. 
  
Drinking Water/Water Supply: The main sources of water in this Village. 
  
Post & Telegraph: It has 1 Post Office.
  
Communication Facilities and Approach to the Village: This Village have State highway 7 (SH7), 2 Foot Path, 2 Navigable River, 2 Navigable Canal, 2 Navigable water-way other than river or canal. Bus services are available but, Railways services is situated at a distance of 5–10 km.
  
Banking Facilities: It has 1 Commercial Bank Bank of India. Credit Society available.  Agricultural Credit Societies is situated in bank or Committee. Non Agricultural Credit Societies is situated in village.  Other Credit Societies is situated at a distance of 5–10 km. 
  
Power Supply:  Power Supply available 
  
Recreational Facilities: No any Recreational facility available Cinema Hall/Video Hall(SHANKAR HALL) is located in village of middle. Sports Club is located in High school Ground.  Stadium/Auditorium is located in Hazaribag District and Ranchi. 

  
Media Exposure: It  the access to both news papers and magazines as both modes of media arrive here. 
  

Villages in Hazaribagh district